Fairy forts (also known as lios or raths from the Irish, referring to an earthen mound) are the remains of stone circles, ringforts, hillforts, or other circular prehistoric dwellings in Ireland. From (possibly) the late Iron Age to early Christian times, the island's occupants built circular structures with earth banks or ditches. These were sometimes topped with wooden palisades and wooden framed buildings. As the dwellings were not durable, in many cases only vague circular marks remain in the landscape. The remains of these structures, in conjunction with the vegetation around them, are associated with local traditions and folklore, perhaps involving fairies or other supposed supernatural entities, who would "defend" the structures from destruction by builders or farmers.

As of 1991 there were between thirty and forty thousand identifiable fairy forts in Ireland's countryside, the oldest of them possibly dating back as early as 600 BCE.

Interpretation

Tradition claimed that ringforts were "fairy forts" imbued with druids' magic and believers in the fairies did not alter them. The early pre-Celtic inhabitants of Ireland (known as the Tuatha Dé Danann and Fir Bolg) came to be seen as mythical and were associated with stories of fairies, also known as the "Good People". Fairy forts and prehistoric Tumuli were seen as entrances to their world. Even cutting brush, especially the sceach or whitethorn, on fairy forts was reputed to be the death of those who performed the act.

There are many folk tales about supernatural events happening at fairy forts. Real accidents which happened at ringforts could be given supernatural explanations. For example, a man who tried to blast a dolmen suffered a septic hand. The wrecked dolmen was subsequently left untouched.

Other traditions hold that a leprechaun may allegedly know of hidden gold in a fairy fort.

In literature, British author Rudyard Kipling made allusions to the process by which such legends grow in his 1906 novel, Puck of Pook's Hill.

Folk tales

Folk tales associated with fairy forts typically relate a curse or retribution enacted upon those who would disturb or destroy the structures. For example, one story collected in 1907 relates that a man who had engaged workmen to level an earthwork fairy fort at Dooneeva or Doonmeeve (near Lahinch in County Clare) simply fell dead; his wife, a wise woman, magically resurrected him unharmed.

Other folk tales relate to the taking of farm animals or people (typically women or children) by the reputed occupants of fairy forts.

As recently as 2011, the financial ruin of developer Seán Quinn was blamed on his moving a fairy fort. And, in 2017, a Kerry politician reputedly suggested that an instance of road subsidence had been caused by the presence of fairy forts locally.

See also
 Early Irish literature
 Fairy path

References

Irish folklore
Fairies